Banks is a village in Cumbria, England, astride the course of Hadrian's Wall, 3 mile (5 km) NE of the market town of Brampton. The historic Lanercost Priory is just a mile (1.5 km) to the SW.

Banks East Turret is a relatively well-preserved turret with adjoining stretches of Hadrian's Wall.

See also

Listed buildings in Burtholme

External links

Villages in Cumbria
City of Carlisle